Singer Island is a peninsula on the Atlantic coast of Palm Beach County, Florida, in the South Florida metropolitan area. Most of it is in the city of Riviera Beach, but the town of Palm Beach Shores occupies its southern tip. Its latitude of is 26.784 N and its longitude is −80.037; Florida's easternmost point is in Palm Beach Shores. Before the Palm Beach Inlet was created, Singer Island was connected to the island of Palm Beach to the south.

History 

Singer Island was originally planned by Paris Singer as a development called Palm Beach Ocean. Along with Addison Mizner, Singer intended to build a luxury resort hotel called the Paris Singer Hotel on the south end of the island, and a more typical resort called the Blue Heron toward the north, with homes and a golf course in between. Due to problems clearing titles, Singer's plans changed, and he decided to build only the luxury hotel on the island's south end and to call it the Blue Heron. Virtually every home lot in Palm Beach Ocean was sold, and $2 million (the equivalent of approximately $28 million in 2018) was poured into the Blue Heron. However, due to the abrupt end of the Florida land boom of the 1920s, not a single house was built on any of the lots, and the Blue Heron was left uncompleted. Its shell was razed in 1940. The Hilton Singer Island Oceanfront Resort now stands in its place.

Notable residents 
Today, Singer Island is a picturesque, upscale and pristine home to thousands of condo owners. The tallest building is the 42-story "Tiara", which was severely damaged by two hurricanes in 2004 but fully restored now. Its residents were displaced from 2004 to 2008.

Singer Island is home to professional golfer Michelle McGann, a longtime resident, and was also home to rocker and E Street Band member Clarence Clemons.

Singer Island is the setting of several Fredrick Exley novels.

See also
 Amaryllis (ship)

Parks 
John D. MacArthur Beach State Park
A unique mixture of coastal and tropical hammock and mangrove forest, this barrier island provides a haven for several rare or endangered native tropical and coastal plant species.

Park Admission – Vehicle

Park Admission – Single Occupant or Motorcycle

Park Admission – Bicycle & Pedestrian

The park's nature center shows visitors why the park is a biological treasure. Visitors can swim, picnic and surf at the beach; snorkeling is also a popular activity.

Birdwatchers may see herons, brown pelicans, terns, sandpipers and gulls.

Anglers can fish in the lagoon by wading or kayaking. Additionally, visitors can fish from non-swimming areas of the beach.

Plan Your Visit

MUNYON ISLAND
The Island was originally called Nuctsachoo by the Seminoles, which means Pelican Island, and it reportedly supported one of the largest wading bird rookeries in South Florida.

Kayakers frequent the shallow estuary. Wildlife on and around Munyon Island includes blue sea grass, great blue herons and little blue herons. The waters contain mojarras, sardines, mullet, pinfish and snapper.

Kayak rentals are available for those that don't have their own equipment. The island, which is accessible only by boat, has no bathrooms, but it does have covered picnic areas and grills.

A boat docking facility is available on Munyon Island. The day-use-only facility accommodates up to 20 boats and provides easy access to the island's nature trails and picnic pavilions.

KAYAKING AT MACARTHUR BEACH
Kayaking at MacArthur Beach State Park provides visitors with a unique experience. Paddle around the estuary or travel under Burnt Bridge into the Lake Worth Lagoon and visit Munyon Island – an outlying part
https://www.floridastateparks.org/parks-and-trails/john-d-macarthur-beach-state-park [7]

References

7. https://www.floridastateparks.org/parks-and-trails/john-d-macarthur-beach-state-park

External links
 VisitFlorida.com page for Singer Island
 Singer Island Civic Association Website – links, news and island resources
 Singer Island Pulse – area community website & daily news

Islands of Florida
Islands of Palm Beach County, Florida